Malcolm Fraser Blue  (born 12 August 1954, in North Adelaide, South Australia) is a Justice of the Supreme Court of South Australia and a reserve Justice of the Supreme Court of Victoria.

Career
A graduate of the University of Adelaide, he was admitted to legal practice in 1977 and was appointed King's Counsel in 2001. He was appointed to the Supreme Court on 12 August 2011. He is a member of the Australasian Institute of Judicial Administration.

In 2005 Blue represented fellow lawyer Eugene McGee at the Kapunda Road Royal Commission into the circumstances surrounding the hit and run death of Ian Humphrey, caused by McGee.

Background
He is the son of Norman Blue and Patricia Blue (née Vogt)  He went to Pembroke School.

References

1954 births
Lawyers from Adelaide
Judges of the Supreme Court of South Australia
Living people
Australian King's Counsel
Adelaide Law School alumni